Astride Gneto (born 24 April 1996) is a French judoka. She won one of the bronze medals in the women's 52 kg event at the 2018 Mediterranean Games held in Tarragona, Spain.

She won one of the bronze medals in the women's team event at the 2016 European Judo Championships held in Kazan, Russia. In the same year, she won the gold medal in the women's 52 kg event at the 2016 Judo Grand Slam Abu Dhabi held in Abu Dhabi, United Arab Emirates. She also won one of the bronze medals in her event at the 2018 Judo Grand Prix The Hague held in The Hague, Netherlands.

In 2019, she won one of the bronze medals in her event at the Judo World Masters held in Qingdao, China. In 2020, she competed in the women's 52 kg event at the European Judo Championships held in Prague, Czech Republic where she was eliminated in the repechage by Natalia Kuziutina of Russia.

In 2021, she won one of the bronze medals in her event at the Judo World Masters held in Doha, Qatar. In June 2021, she competed in the women's 52 kg and mixed team events at the World Judo Championships held in Budapest, Hungary. In her own event she was eliminated in her second match and in the mixed team event she won the silver medal.

She won the gold medal in her event at the 2022 Judo Grand Slam Tel Aviv held in Tel Aviv, Israel. She won one of the bronze medals in her event at the 2022 Judo Grand Slam Antalya held in Antalya, Turkey.

References

External links

 
 
 

Living people
1996 births
Place of birth missing (living people)
French female judoka
Competitors at the 2018 Mediterranean Games
Mediterranean Games bronze medalists for France
Mediterranean Games medalists in judo
European Games competitors for France
Judoka at the 2019 European Games
21st-century French women